Headed for a Breakdown is the second album from Cheap Sex. The album was recorded with Punk Core Records.

Track listing
 "False Pride" - 3:14
 "Last of the True" - 2:13
 "Desperation" - 3:11
 "Lucky to Be Alive" - 2:45
 "Reality TV" - 1:35
 "Water Runs Dry" - 2:43
 "Worst Nightmare" - 2:09
 "Headed for a Breakdown" - 1:49
 "White Sheep" - 1:45
 "Raped by the FCC" - 2:51
 "Child Molester" - 2:48
 "Walking Disease" - 3:41
 "Boy in a Bubble" - 10:43
 "Fuck Emo" (hidden track)

Credits
 Bridget - Photography
 Brian - Photography
 Kerch - Album Art
 Alan Douches - Mastering
 Jeff Forrest - Engineer

References

Sources
Sing365.com album page

Cheap Sex albums
Punk Core Records albums
2004 albums